Mühle, Muehle,  is an occupational surname related to the occupation of miller and literally means "mill". Notable people with the surname include:
Jörg Mühle, German freelance illustrator, and author of children's books
Wilhelm Mühle, the namesake of the historical  Mühle House, Romania
Founders and owners of Mühle Glashütte, German watchmaker

German-language surnames
Occupational surnames